The men's 100 metres at the 1974 European Athletics Championships was held in Rome, Italy, at Stadio Olimpico on 2 and 3 September 1974.

Medalists

Results

Final
3 September
Wind: -1 m/s

Semi-finals
3 September

Semi-final 1
Wind: 2 m/s

Semi-final 2
Wind: 1.5 m/s

Heats
2 September

Heat 1
Wind: -1.2 m/s

Heat 2
Wind: -2.5 m/s

Heat 3
Wind: -0.6 m/s

Heat 4
Wind: -1 m/s

Participation
According to an unofficial count, 28 athletes from 14 countries participated in the event.

 (1)
 (2)
 (3)
 (3)
 (1)
 (1)
 (3)
 (1)
 (3)
 (3)
 (1)
 (2)
 (1)
 (3)

References

100 metres
100 metres at the European Athletics Championships